Biederitz is a municipality in the Jerichower Land district, in Saxony-Anhalt, Germany. It consists of the following Ortschaften or municipal divisions:
Biederitz
Gerwisch
Gübs
Heyrothsberge
Königsborn
Woltersdorf

Gerwisch, Gübs, Königsborn and Woltersdorf were merged into the municipality Biederitz in January 2010.

References

Municipalities in Saxony-Anhalt
Jerichower Land